This is a list of Aterballetto productions.  Aterballetto is an Italian modern dance company founded in 1979 by Vittorio Biagi and based in the north eastern Italian city of Reggio Emilia. It acquired its present name in 1979.

Aterballetto is the principal producing and touring dance company in Italy and also the first permanent ballet-producing organisation independent of an opera house in Italy. The company enjoys worldwide recognition for its productions performed in theatres and festivals throughout Europe, North America, South America, Africa and Asia.
Since 1997 the company's artistic director and choreographer is Mauro Bigonzetti.

The company's style is marked by the ability to shift across a wide range of musical styles, from classical to pop and jazz.

Productions

References

External links 

  
  
 Fabio Grossi with Aterballetto (Athens 1998)

Ballet companies in Italy
Lists of ballets by company
1977 establishments in Italy